Ashok G. Modak is an Indian national born in 1940 currently residing in Mumbai. He did his Master of Arts (M.A.) first in Economics (1963) and later in Political Science (1967) from the University of Pune. He obtained his Doctorate (Ph.D.) from the Jawaharlal Nehru University, New Delhi in 1980. His Doctorate subject was "Soviet Economic Aid to India." In recognition of his contribution in the field of education, the Government of India nominated him for the position of National Research Professor on 6 January 2015 for a period of five years.

On 21st Jan 2016, Professor Lokesh Chandra, President - Indian Council for Cultural Relations (ICCR) appointed Dr. Modak as a member of the reconstituted General Assembly of ICCR for a term of three years.

In 1963 he began his teaching career as lecturer in Economics at the Arts, Science and Commerce College at Chalisgaon in Jalgaon District in the state of Maharashtra. Later after serving as lecturer in Ramnarain Ruia College, Mumbai he joined as Reader in the Centre for Soviet Studies, University of Mumbai. Whilst at this juncture; in 1994 he was invited by the Bharatiya Janata Party (BJP) to be a candidate from the Graduates Constituency of the Konkan region in the state of Maharashtra. He won the elections in 1994 and 2000 to become a Member of the Legislative Council (MLC) of the state of Maharashtra. He continued in this position for 12 years till 2006.

In 2006, the University of Mumbai offered him the Honorary position of Adjunct Professor in the Centre for Central Eurasian Studies and he has been busy in this role till date.

Modak has pursued his research activities in several countries like the former USSR, the Netherlands, United Kingdom, former Yugoslavia to name a few. In 1986 the US Government invited him for a monthlong participation in seminars pertaining to Superpower Relations. He was a research student at Jawaharlal Nehru University, New Delhi, Oriental Institute, Moscow (Russia) and also at the Institute of Social Studies, The Hague, the Netherlands.

He has written 30 books, over 104 research papers and several newspaper and magazine articles in periodicals like International Studies, Journal of Indian Council of World Affairs New Delhi and Eternal India; New Delhi.

Recipient of the Best Parliamentarian Award (1997) from the Legislative Council, Mumbai; Modak also won the P.B. Bhave Orator Award, Writer-Award and Chhatrapati Sambhaji Maharaj Award for his work in the Legislative Council of Maharashtra.

Modak has also voluntarily involved himself on various forums and committees. Currently he is the President of two educational institutes in the state of Maharashtra. He heads the Konkan Graduates Forum which deals with imparting vocational education to female students. He also heads the Sahyadri Adiwasi Bahuvidha Sewa Sangh; an organisation rendering welfare services to tribal people of the Thane district in Maharashtra. 
He recently delivered a lecture series on "Integral Humanism and Westernism – A Comparative Analysis"; "Relevance of Integral Humanism in Present Era" by India Foundation; New Delhi and India Policy Foundation; New Delhi.

Academic Qualifications, Research Activities and Work Experience 
 1963		: Master of Arts in Economics; University of Pune
 1967		: Master of Arts in Political Science; University of Pune
 1963 to 1967	: Lecturer in Economics at the Arts, Science and Commerce College at Chalisgaon, Jalgaon District,  Maharashtra
 1967 to 1969	: Research activities; Indian School of International Studies, New Delhi
 1969 to 1971	: Research activities on Soviet Relations with India; Oriental Institute, Moscow
 1971 to 1983	: Lecturer in Ramnarain Ruia College, Mumbai
 1974 to 1975	: Thesis on Role of Nikita Khrushchev in Soviet Yugoslav Relations; Institute of Social Studies, The Hague, the Netherlands
 1975	        : Post Graduate Diploma in International Development; Institute of Social Studies, The Hague, the Netherlands
 1980	        : 
 1983 to 1994	: Reader in the Centre for Soviet Studies, University of Mumbai
 1994 to 2006	: Member of the Legislative Council (MLC); Maharashtra
 2006 to Date	: Honorary Adjunct Professor - Centre for Central Eurasian Studies; University of Mumbai
 2006 to Date  : Political, social and economic commentator for leading news and print media

Selected Books and Research Articles 
 	Economic History of the Soviet Union
 	Analysis of Gorbachev Era
 	Economic Thinking of Gopal Krishna Gokhale
 	A Genuine Socialist Thinker – Dr. Ram Manohar Lohia
 	Was Swami Vivekananda a Socialist
 	Left Front Rule in West Bengal – Genesis, Growth and Decay
       १८५७ चा स्वातंत्र्य लढा - द्रिष्टीकोन व मत मतांतरे 
       हिंदुत्व - न्यायालयीन निवाडा आणि सेकुलर आग पाखड
       नामदार गोपाळ कृष्ण गोखले
       श्री गुरुजी - जीवन आणि कार्य
       धर्मपाल साहित्य - शोध आणि बोध
       शिक्षणाचे भगवीकरण   - आक्षेप आणि तथ्य
       राष्ट्र विचाराचे सामाजिक आशय
       विवेकानंद - विचार आणि सध्यस्तिथि
   	स्वामी विवेकानंद - चिरंतन चैतन्याचा स्त्रोत

Web References 
 https://web.archive.org/web/20141130004134/http://www.esakal.com/TagSearch.aspx?TagName=dr.%20ashok%20modak
 http://www.bookganga.com/eBooks/Books/Details/5003411020206404958
 https://web.archive.org/web/20140715110820/http://www.mu.ac.in/arts/social_science/Eurasian_Studies/Seminar.html
 http://www.oneindia.com/2006/06/04/bjp-to-field-sanjay-kelkar-for-mlc-polls-1149492467.html
 https://web.archive.org/web/20150924030239/http://www.hindunet.org/hvk/specialrepo/mms/ch2.html
 http://www.indiapolicyfoundation.org/Encyc/2014/9/18/351_03_47_54_Brochure.pdf

References

National Research Professor
National Research Professor Nomination

1940 births
Living people
Jawaharlal Nehru University alumni
Academic staff of the University of Mumbai
Savitribai Phule Pune University alumni
Writers from Mumbai